Mount Puti, also known as Mount Jing is a mountain located in Changshou District of Chongqing, China, with a height of  above sea level.

History
According to the Changshou County Annals, the mountain is named after Bodhidharma, the Indian Buddhist monk who disseminated Buddhism in ancient China.

In 1507, during the Zhengde period (1506-1522) of Ming dynasty (1368-1644), Dai Jin, a jinshi in Changshou County, renamed it as Mount Jing.

It has been categorized as a AAAA-level tourist site by the China National Tourism Administration in May 2017.

Attractions
Mount Puti is noted for Puti Temple, a Buddhist temple located on the top of the mountain, it was first construction in the Northern Song dynasty (960-1127) and rebuilt many times. The present temple was reconstructed in October 2014, the complex includes the following halls: Shanmen, Mahavira Hall, Hall of Four Heavenly Kings, Hall of Guanyin, Bell tower, Drum tower, Founder's Hall, Buddhist Texts Library, Dharma Hall, Dining Room, etc.

The Puti Lantern is a famous scenic spot in the mountain.

The Wanshou Stone Stairs is a tourist attraction on the mountain. It has 1,567 steps and 19,999 patterns of Chinese character "".

Gallery

References

Puti
Tourist attractions in Chongqing